The 2010–11 Milwaukee Panthers men's basketball team represented the University of Wisconsin–Milwaukee during the 2010–11 NCAA Division I men's basketball season. Their head coach was Rob Jeter. They played their home games at US Cellular Arena, along with one game (plus two exhibitions) at the Klotsche Center, and are members of the Horizon League. They finished the season 19–14, 13–5 in Horizon League play to share the regular season conference title with Butler and Cleveland State. They advanced to the championship game of the 2011 Horizon League men's basketball tournament before losing to Butler. They were invited to the 2011 National Invitation Tournament where they lost in the first round to Northwestern.

2010 recruiting class

Coaching staff

Roster

2010–11 Schedule and results
All times are Central

|-
!colspan=9 style=| Exhibition

|-

|-
!colspan=9 style=| Regular season

|-

|-

|-
!colspan=9 style=| Horizon League tournament

|-
!colspan=9 style=| NIT

Rankings

References

Milwaukee Panthers men's basketball seasons
Milwaukee Panthers
Milwaukee